Ekuk is a small unincorporated community in the Dillingham Census Area in the U.S. state of Alaska. As of both the 2000 and 2010 U.S. Censuses, it had a population of 2. It is classified by the U.S. Census as an Alaska Native Village Statistical Area (ANVSA). Until 2002 it was the site of a large fish processing operation owned by Wards Cove Packing Company. Currently, it is inhabited mainly by seasonal fishing families who set gillnet in the nearby waters of the Nushagak Bay for mid-summer runs of sockeye salmon, early season runs of king salmon and late season runs of silver salmon.

Located 15 miles southeast of Dillingham, Ekuk is accessible only by sea or by air.

Located in Southwest Alaska on the shores of Bristol Bay (and the Bering Sea), the nearby terrain is covered with tundra with few trees or shrubbery.

Demographics

At one point historically the Russians were there. Ekuk first appeared on the 1880 U.S. Census as an unincorporated village of 112 residents, all Yup'ik. It appeared as "Yekuk" on the 1890 census. It did not appear on the census again until 1930 (as Ekuk), and then not again until 1960. It was given the census designation of Alaska Native Village Statistical Area (ANVSA) in 1990.

References

External links
 Alaska Division of Community Advocacy - Community Information Summary 

Unincorporated communities in Dillingham Census Area, Alaska
Unincorporated communities in Alaska
Unincorporated communities in Unorganized Borough, Alaska